United Nations Security Council resolution 602, adopted unanimously on 25 November 1987, after hearing representations from the People's Republic of Angola, the council recalled resolutions 387 (1976), 428 (1978), 447 (1979), 454 (1979), 475 (1980), 545 (1983), 546 (1984), 567 (1985), 571 (1985), 574 (1985) and 577 (1985), expressing its concern at the continuing military incursions into the country by South Africa through occupied South West Africa (Namibia).

The Council demanded South Africa cease Operation Moduler and respect Angola's sovereignty and territorial integrity, noting the "illegal entry of the head of the racist South African regime and some of his Ministers" into Angola. The representative of Ghana, which introduced the resolution, said the continued attacks were an affront to the council's authority. It called for a complete and unconditional withdrawal of South African forces from southern Angola, requesting the Secretary-General to monitor the implementation of the current resolution and reporting back no later than 10 December 1987.

The resolution was a direct rejection of South Africa's offer to withdraw its troops from Angola if other nations, such as Cuba, did the same.

See also
 Angola – South Africa relations
 Cuban intervention in Angola
 South Africa Border War
 United Nations Security Council Resolution 606
 Operation Moduler

References

External links
 
Text of the Resolution at undocs.org

 0602
20th century in South Africa
1987 in South Africa
1987 in Africa
1987 in Angola
 0602
Angola–South Africa relations
November 1987 events